Julius Sämann (15 April 1911 in Uffenheim, Germany – May 9, 1999) was a German-Canadian perfumist and chemist who invented many everyday items, including Little Trees pine-tree-shaped air fresheners in Watertown, New York in 1952.

Sämann was born in Uffenheim, Bavaria, Germany to parents Simon Sämann and Lia Weglein.

References

1911 births
1999 deaths
20th-century Canadian businesspeople
20th-century Canadian inventors
20th-century German inventors
German emigrants to Canada